Worcester Foregate Street railway station, opened by the Great Western Railway in 1860 serves the city of Worcester, Worcestershire, England. It is one of the two stations serving the city, with the other station, Worcester Shrub Hill, being located to the east. A third station, is located just outside the city to the south-east.

The station layout is unusual in that travelling east the two platforms serve different routes, rather than different directions. Platform 1 can only be accessed by trains via Worcester Shrub Hill (including trains to and from London Paddington and via Cheltenham Spa towards the southwest), while Platform 2 can only be accessed from the east by trains running directly to and from Droitwich Spa, avoiding Shrub Hill. This means that Great Western Railway services can only stop at Platform 1, as all of these trains stop at Shrub Hill.

There is a cafe called Cafe Loco at the end of Platform 1 in the old signal box.

The station itself is built on a viaduct, meaning that space for expansion is restricted, but the platforms are nevertheless of ample length to accommodate an HST. Despite its small size, the remains of two signal boxes can be seen, one spanning the tracks and the second now the station cafe.

History

The station opened on 17 May 1860. It was originally part of the Hereford and Worcester Railway which was incorporated into the West Midland Railway, before being absorbed by the Great Western Railway. On 1 January 1948 the company became Government owned under British Railways. The Butts Spur line was also constructed in 1860 with the unfulfilled aim of connecting the station to Diglis for the conveyance of freight.

 Since 1973 the station has had an unusual layout, being essentially two single-track lines side by side rather than the ordinary double-track layout which it appears to be. The two single lines run from Henwick, on the other side of the River Severn, through Foregate Street, to the site of the former Rainbow Hill Junction to the east of the station, which used to provide a crossover between the  two tracks. At this point the lines diverge with that on the north side heading towards Tunnel Junction and Droitwich Spa, while the southern track leads to Worcester Shrub Hill. Rainbow Hill Junction was removed when the signalling in the area was remodelled in 1973. Since then, platform 1 (on the south side) has only been usable by trains running via Shrub Hill, and platform 2 only by trains running directly to or from Droitwich without calling at Shrub Hill. Signs at the station (see right) warn of "Two-way working on both lines".

The station celebrated its 150th birthday on 23 May 2010 with the unveiling of a plaque and a special train that ran to Great Malvern railway station (which celebrated its 150th Anniversary on the same date).

The art gallery Movement opened on platform 2 on 2 October 2010.

The station was upgraded in 2014, which included a refurbished subway, two new entrances with automatic doors, relocation of the lift at the second entrance to be enclosed in the station building and conversion of one of the railway arches into a bike shelter. The bridge was also strengthened and repainted.

Services

The station is served by two train operating companies: West Midlands Trains (who manage the station) and Great Western Railway. West Midlands Trains operate services to Birmingham via two different routes, either to Birmingham New Street via Bromsgrove or to Birmingham Snow Hill via Kidderminster.

Many of the trains on both these routes run to/from Great Malvern, though the ones that start and finish at Shrub Hill have convenient connections from here.

See also

Worcester Shrub Hill railway station
Worcester (Norton) Parkway railway station

References

Further reading

External links

Buildings and structures in Worcester, England
Transport in Worcester, England
Railway stations in Worcestershire
DfT Category C2 stations
Former Great Western Railway stations
Railway stations in Great Britain opened in 1860
Railway stations served by Great Western Railway
Railway stations served by West Midlands Trains